Promalactis dimolybda is a moth of the family Oecophoridae. It is found in Fujian, Hubei, Sichuan and Zhejiang provinces of China.

The wingspan is about 9.5-11.5 mm. The ground colour of the forewings is ochreous yellow. The hindwings and cilia are dark grey.

References

Moths described in 1935
Oecophorinae